Lavassaare Nature Reserve is a nature reserve which is located in Pärnu County, Estonia.

The area of the nature reserve is 11,132 ha.

The protected area was founded in 1957 on the basis of Virussaare Wetland Conservation Area. In 2017 the protected area was designated to the nature reserve.

References

Nature reserves in Estonia
Geography of Pärnu County